Sanyi or Nanpanshun, also known by Cantonese romanizations such as Sam Yup and Nam Pun Shun, refers to the three districts (former counties) of Nanhai, Panyu and Shunde surrounding Guangzhou and Foshan in Guangdong, China.

Geography
The former counties and the corresponding modern districts are
Nanhai
Modern Nanhai and Chancheng in Foshan and a small part of Liwan in Guangzhou
Panyu
Modern Panyu, Yuexiu, large part of Liwan, Haizhu, Huangpu, Baiyun and large part of Nansha, all in Guangzhou
Shunde
Modern Shunde, Foshan

Dialects
The area gave rise to the Yuehai dialects, the most prominent of which is Cantonese (Guangzhou/Guangfu dialect). Standard Cantonese is based on the Yuehai dialects belongs to the Yue branch of Chinese, Cantonese speakers easily understand throughout Chinese part of Lingnan area.

Emigration

Most of the Chinese immigrants to the United States in the late 19th century and early 20th century came from eight districts in the Pearl River Delta, including the three districts of Sanyi, together with the four districts of Siyi to the southwest and the district of Zhongshan.

See also 
Siyi
Yue Chinese

References

Guangdong